Emamzadeh Seyyed Mahmud Rural District is a rural district (dehestan) in Sardasht District, Dezful County, Khuzestan Province, Iran. In a 2006 census, its population was 1,304, in 213 families.  The rural district has 55 villages.

References 

Rural Districts of Khuzestan Province
Dezful County